"The Big L." is a song by Swedish pop duo Roxette. Written by Per Gessle, it was released as the third single from their third studio album, Joyride (1991), on 26 August 1991. The song became a top ten hit in Belgium, Ireland and Sweden, and was the highest-charting single released from Joyride in France. It also reached the top twenty in a number of other countries, including Australia, Austria, Finland, Germany, the Netherlands, Spain and Switzerland. Despite a US radio mix of the song appearing on CD versions of the single, it was never released as a single in North America.

Critical reception
Aberdeen Press and Journal commented on the song, that "they can still bang out a decent tune." AllMusic editor Bryan Buss wrote in his review of Joyride, that "The Big L." follows "in the successful vein Gessle and Fredriksson mined with "The Look". Swedish newspaper Expressen called it a "peppery pop song adorned with details from old rock 'n' roll". I Dag described it as "classic pop that could just as well be Gyllene Tider in the 90s". Kim Såtvedt from Norwegian newspaper Laagendalsposten noted it as a "useful up-tempo song". Music & Media wrote that the song is "again proof of Per Gessle's knack for writing pleasant pop underpinned by rocking beats. The casual but economic production further adds to the song's power."

Formats and track listings
All songs were written and composed by Per Gessle.

 Cassette and 7-inch single (Europe 1364347 · UK EM204)
 "The Big L." – 4:29
 "One Is Such a Lonely Number" (Demo, September 1987) – 3:33

 12-inch single (Europe 1364346)
 "The Big L." (The Bigger, The Better Mix) – 6:17
 "The Big L." – 4:29
 "One Is Such a Lonely Number" (Demo) – 3:33

 CD single (Europe 1364342)
 "The Big L." – 4:29
 "One Is Such a Lonely Number" (Demo) – 3:33
 "The Big L." (The Bigger, The Better Mix) – 6:17
 "The Big L." (US Mix) – 4:35

Credits and personnel
Credits are adapted from the liner notes of The Rox Box/Roxette 86–06.

Studios
 Recorded in June 1990 at EMI Studios (Stockholm, Sweden)
 Mixed at EMI Studios (Stockholm, Sweden)

Musicians
 Marie Fredriksson – lead vocals, background vocals
 Per Gessle – lead vocals, background vocals, mixing
 Anders Herrlin – programming, engineering
 Jonas Isacsson – electric guitars, acoustic guitars, harmonica
 Clarence Öfwerman – keyboards, programming, production, mixing
 Staffan Öfwerman – background vocals
 Alar Suurna – mixing, engineering

Charts

Weekly charts

Year-end charts

References

1991 singles
1991 songs
Roxette songs
Songs written by Per Gessle